The Djagaraga or Gudang (Pantyinamu/Yatay/Gudang/Kartalaiga and other clans) are an Australian Aboriginal tribe, traditionally lived in the coastal area from Cape York to Fly point, including also Pabaju (Albany Island), in the Cape York Peninsula, Queensland. In the early period of white settlement as the Somerset tribe, after the settlement of Somerset established on their lands in 1863.

The names Yatay, Gudang and Kartalaiga appear to be exonyms from Kalau Lagau Ya (the Western and Central Torres Strait Islanders), respectively yadai "words", gudalnga ("mouthy") and katalaiga "green frog person"; the totem of the Kartalaiga was the green frog.

Language
They spoke Gudang language, alt. Djagaraga, which according to Kenneth L. Hale's classification, was one of 10 languages of a northern Paman subgroup.

Social organization
The Djagaraga were divided up into hordes, of which four, according to Tindale, are thought to be registered, though some of these are now counted as distinct tribes.
 Gudang/Alauian (Cape York)
 Unduamo.
 Kekosino. (Escape River)
 Kokiliga. (?).

Social culture
Nonie Smith states that their 'relations with the Western Torres Strait Island people the Kaurareg were 'so close that despite their distinct identity they could be regarded almost as an outpost of the latter.' They also shared trade, kin and ritual links with their eastern coastal tribal neighbour, the Unduyamo Some recent scholarship, basing its inferences on the density of ceremonial rock structures throughout the territory of the Gudang and Unduyamo, speculates that they may have functioned as ceremonial masters for rites of initiation and the magical increase of natural species also for the Torres Strait peoples with whom they had close relations of trade, marriage and religion.

History
According to Dr. Creed, large numbers of the Djagaraga were killed off by the Yadhaykenu within living memory.

Notes

Citations

Sources

Aboriginal peoples of Queensland
Far North Queensland